Sveti Matej ("Saint Matthew") is a village in Croatia.

Description 
In the village is located an old church dedicated to Matthew the Apostle. In 2001, there were 631 residents of this village.

Notes 

Populated places in Krapina-Zagorje County